The Ohio House of Representatives is the lower house of the Ohio General Assembly, the state legislature of the U.S. state of Ohio; the other house of the bicameral legislature being the Ohio Senate.

The House of Representatives first met in Chillicothe on March 3, 1803, under the later superseded state constitution of that year. In 1816, the capital was moved to Columbus, where it is located today.

Members are limited to four successive two-year elected terms (terms are considered successive if they are separated by less than four years). Time served by appointment to fill out another representative's uncompleted term does not count against the term limit. There are 99 members in the house, elected from single-member districts. Every even-numbered year, all the seats are up for re-election.

Composition

Leadership

Members of the 135th House of Representatives

↑: Member was originally appointed to the seat.

Officials

Speaker of the House
The Speaker of the House of Representatives is the presiding officer of the House. The duties of the Speaker include preserving order and decorum at all times, recognizing visitors in the galleries, controlling and providing security for the Hall, appointing members to perform the duties of the Speaker for a temporary period of time, naming committees and subcommittees and appointing their chairs and members, overseeing the performance of House employees, and signing bills, acts, resolutions, and more.

Clerk of the House
The Clerk of the House of Representatives is in charge of and regulates the distribution of records of the House. The Clerk is the custodian of legislative documents within the House. The duties of the Clerk include examining bills or resolutions before introduction, numbering bills and resolutions for filing, providing bills and documents pertaining to the bill to the chair of the corresponding committee, publishing calendars to notify the public about bills and resolutions, keeping a journal of House proceedings, superintending the presentation of bills and resolutions, and attesting writs and subpoenas issued by the House of Representatives.

Sergeant-at-Arms 
The Sergeant-at-arms of the House of Representatives is tasked with maintaining security and order in the House. The Sergeant-at-arms may be ordered by the Speaker to clear the aisles if this is deemed necessary by the Speaker. Other duties of the Sergeant-at-arms include controlling admission to the building, serving subpoenas and warrants issued by the House, and bringing any members found to be absent without leave to the House.

Standing Committees
The Speaker of the House is in charge of naming all committees and subcommittees.
The current standing committees, chairs, vice chairs, and ranking members are:

Past composition of the House of Representatives

References

External links
 
 Project Vote Smart – State House of Ohio
 Map of Ohio House Districts
 Ohio District Maps 2002–2012
 Election results from Ohio Secretary of State

 
House Of Representatives
State lower houses in the United States